Bombyliinae is a subfamily of bee flies in the family Bombyliidae. There are more than 70 genera in Bombyliinae.

Genera 
These genera and tribes belong to the subfamily Bombyliinae:

Subfamily Bombyliinae Latreille, 1802
 Tribe Acrophthalmydini Hull
 Genus Acrophthalmyda Bigot, 1858
 Genus Paramonovius Li & Yeates, 2019
 Genus Sisyromyia White, 1916
 Tribe Adelidini Li & Yeates, 2019
 Genus Adelidea Macquart, 1840
 Genus Platamomyia Brèthes, 1924
 Genus Sosiomyia Bezzi, 1921
 Tribe Bombyliini Latreille, 1802
 Genus Anastoechus Osten Sacken, 1877
 Genus Australoechus Greathead, 1995
 Genus Beckerellus Greathead, 1995
 Genus Bombomyia Greathead, 1995
 Genus Bombylella Greathead, 1995
 Genus Bombylisoma Rondani, 1856
 Genus Bombylius Linnæus, 1758
 Genus Choristus Walker, 1852
 Genus Cryomyia Hull, 1973
 Genus Dissodesma
 Genus Doliogethes Hesse, 1938
 Genus Efflatounia Bezzi, 1924
 Genus Eremyia Greathead, 1996
 Genus Eristalopsis Evenhuis, 1985
 Genus Euchariomyia Bigot
 Genus Eurycarenus Loew, 1860
 Genus Heterostylum Macquart, 1848
 Genus Karakumia Paramonov, 1926
 Genus Lambkinomyia
 Genus Lepidochlanus Hesse, 1938
 Genus Mandella Evenhuis, 1983
 Genus Meomyia Evenhuis, 1983
 Genus Nectaropota Philippi, 1865
 Genus Neobombylodes Evenhuis, 1978
 Genus Nigromyia
 Genus Parachistus Greathead, 1980
 Genus Parasystoechus Hall, 1975
 Genus Parisus Walker, 1852
 Genus Semistoechus
 Genus Staurostichus Hull, 1973
 Genus Systoechus Loew, 1855
 Genus Tovlinius Zaitsev, 1979
 Genus Triplasius Loew, 1855
 Genus Triploechus Edwards, 1937
 Genus Xerachistus Greathead, 1995
 Genus Zentamyia
 Genus Zinnomyia Hesse, 1955
 Tribe Conophorini Becker
 Genus Aldrichia Coquillett, 1894
 Genus Conophorina Becker, 1920
 Genus Conophorus Meigen, 1803
 Genus Sparnopolius Loew, 1855
 Tribe Dischistini Hull
 Genus Dischistus Loew, 1855
 Genus Eusurbus Roberts, 1929
 Genus Gonarthrus Bezzi, 1921
 Genus Isocnemus Bezzi, 1924
 Genus Laurella Heraty, 2002
 Genus Pilosia Hull, 1973
 Genus Robertsmyia
 Genus Sericusia Edwards, 1937
 Genus Sisyrophanus Karsch, 1886
 Tribe Eclimini Hull
 Genus Cyrtomyia Bigot, 1892
 Genus Eclimus Loew, 1844
 Genus Lepidophora Westwood, 1835
 Genus Palintonus François, 1964
 Genus Thevenetimyia Bigot, 1875
 Genus Tillyardomyia Tonnoir, 1927
 Tribe Hallidini Li & Yeates, 2019
 Genus Hallidia Hull, 1970
 Genus Legnotomyia Bezzi, 1902
 Genus Notolegnotus Greathead & Evenhuis, 2001
 Genus Prorachthes Loew, 1869
 Tribe Marmasomini Li & Yeates, 2019
 Genus Marmasoma White, 1917
 Genus Paratoxophora Engel, 1936
 Tribe Nothoschistini Li & Yeates, 2019
 Genus Cacoplox Hull, 1970
 Genus Euprepina Hull, 1971
 Genus Nothoschistus Bowden, 1985
 Genus Neodischistus Painter, 1933

References

External links 

 

Bombyliidae
Asilomorpha subfamilies